The 1986–87 Serie A season was the 53rd season of the Serie A, the top level of ice hockey in Italy. 10 teams participated in the league, and AS Varese Hockey won the championship by defeating HC Bozen in the final.

First round

Second round

Group A

Group B

Playoffs

External links
 Season on hockeyarchives.info

1986-87
Italy
Serie